The 2010–11 Texas Tech Red Raiders men's basketball team represented Texas Tech University in the 2010-11 NCAA Division I men's basketball season. The Red Raiders' were led by Pat Knight in his third full season as the Red Raiders' thirteenth head coach. The team plays its home games at the United Spirit Arena in Lubbock, Texas and are members of the Big 12 Conference. They finished with 13–19, 5–11 in Big 12 play. They were eliminated by Missouri in the first round. They were not invited to a postseason tournament.

Preseason
The Red Raiders were picked to finish 7th in conference play.

Schedule

|-
!colspan=9 style=|Regular Season

|-
! colspan=9 style=| Big 12 Tournament

References

External links
 Official Texas Tech Red Raiders men's basketball page 

Texas Tech Red Raiders basketball seasons
Texas Tech
Texas Tech Red Raiders basketball
Texas Tech Red Raiders basketball